Thomas Stockton (April 1, 1781 – March 2, 1846) was an American soldier and politician from New Castle in New Castle County, Delaware. He was a veteran of the War of 1812, and a member of the Whig Party, who served as Governor of Delaware.

Early life and family
Stockton was born in New Castle Hundred, New Castle County, Delaware, son of John and Nancy Griffin Stockton. His father was a brigadier general in the War of 1812, leading the 1st Brigade of Delaware militia. He married Fidelia Johns, daughter of Chancellor Kensey Johns, and they had five children, Thomas, William, James, Elizabeth, and Fidelia. They lived in the Kensey Johns-Van Dyke house at 300 Delaware Street and were members of the Immanuel Episcopal Church in New Castle.

Military career
After graduating from Princeton College, Stockton joined the Delaware militia. During the War of 1812 he was part of the attack on Fort George on the Niagara River and fought at Lundy's Lane. Eventually he was promoted to a major in the 42nd Infantry. He retired from the U.S. Army in 1825.

Political career
Stockton was the New Castle County Register in Chancery from 1832 to 1835. Several years later, in 1844, he was elected Governor of Delaware by defeating William Tharp, the Democratic Party candidate. He took office January 21, 1845 and served until his death on March 2, 1846. He was the sixth Governor of Delaware to die in office.

He was a member of the Society of the Cincinnati.

Death and legacy
Stockton died at New Castle and is buried there at the Immanuel Episcopal Church Cemetery. Several of his sons and grandsons served in the Civil War.

{|class=wikitable style="width: 94%" style="text-align: center;" align="center"
|-bgcolor=#cccccc
!colspan=12 style="background: #ccccff;" |Delaware General Assembly   (sessions while Governor)
|-
!Year
!Assembly
!
!Senate Majority
!Speaker
!
!House Majority
!Speaker
|-
|1845-1846
|63rd
|
| |Whig
| |Joseph Maull
|
| |Whig
| |William Temple
|-

Almanac
Elections are held the first Tuesday after November 1. The governor takes office the third Tuesday of January and has a four-year term.

{|class=wikitable style="width: 94%" style="text-align: center;" align="center"
|-bgcolor=#cccccc
!colspan=7 style="background: #ccccff;" |Public Offices
|-
! Office
! Type
! Location
! Began office
! Ended office
! notes 
|-
|Register in Chancery
|Judiciary  
|New Castle
|1832
|1835
|
|-
|Governor
|Executive  
|Dover
|January 21, 1845
|March 2, 1846
|

{|class=wikitable style="width: 94%" style="text-align: center;" align="center"
|-bgcolor=#cccccc
!colspan=12 style="background: #ccccff;" |Election results
|-
!Year
!Office
!
!Subject
!Party
!Votes
!%
!
!Opponent
!Party
!Votes
!%
|-
|1844
|Governor
|
| |Thomas Stockton
| |Whig
| |6,140
| |50%
|
| |William Tharp
| |Democratic
| |6,095
| |50%

References

Images
Hall of Governors Portrait Gallery Portrait courtesy of Historical and Cultural Affairs, Dover.

External links
Biographical Directory of the Governors of the United States
Delaware’s Governors

The Political Graveyard

Places with more information
Delaware Historical Society; website; 505 North Market Street, Wilmington, Delaware 19801; (302) 655-7161
University of Delaware; Library website; 181 South College Avenue, Newark, Delaware 19717; (302) 831-2965

1781 births
1846 deaths
People from New Castle, Delaware
Delaware Whigs
Governors of Delaware
Burials in New Castle County, Delaware
Whig Party state governors of the United States
19th-century American politicians
19th-century American Episcopalians